Tim Prentice (born c. 1964) is an American industrial designer and president of Motonium Design in California. Prentice holds a B.S. in industrial technology from California State University, Chico (1987) and is a graduate of Art Center College of Design's transportation program (1990). He has also been an instructor at Art Center for industrial design and illustration, as well as a guest lecturer at Stanford University.

Prentice was motorcycle designer of the 2009 Triumph Thunderbird motorcycle, Mission Motors' 2010 Mission R electric motorcycle, and the 2011 Triumph Speed Triple. Prentice and his firm won the Red Dot and Core77 industrial design awards in 2011 (respectively) for the Mission R.

References

External links

1964 births
Living people
American motorcycle designers
California State University, Chico alumni
Art Center College of Design alumni
Art Center College of Design faculty